Luís Morais (23 August 1930 – 6 January 2020), also known as Cabeção,  was a Brazilian football player. He played for the Brazil national football team at the 1954 FIFA World Cup finals.

Cabeção played club football for Corinthians, Bangu, Portuguesa, Comercial-SP, Juventus-SP and Portuguesa Santista, winning the Campeonato Paulista in 1951, 1952 and 1954 with Corinthians. Cabeção died on 6 January 2020 at the age of 89.

References

External links
Profile at Que Fim Levou?

1930 births
2020 deaths
Brazilian footballers
Brazil international footballers
1954 FIFA World Cup players
Sport Club Corinthians Paulista players
Bangu Atlético Clube players
Associação Portuguesa de Desportos players
Comercial Futebol Clube (Ribeirão Preto) players
Clube Atlético Juventus players
Associação Atlética Portuguesa (Santos) players
Association football goalkeepers
Footballers from São Paulo